Molla Ali (also Romanized as Mollā ‘Alī) is a village in Qorqori Rural District, Qorqori District, Hirmand County, Sistan and Baluchestan Province, Iran. At the 2006 census, its population was 897, in 181 families.

References 

Populated places in Hirmand County